Standalone software may refer to:

 Computer programs that can work offline, i.e. does not necessarily require network connection to function
 Software that is not a part of some bundled software
 A program that run as a separate computer process, not an add-on of an existing process
 Standalone program, a program that does not require operating system's services to run
 A portable application, which can be run without the need for installation procedure
 Stand-alone expansion pack, expansion packs that do not require the original game

See also
 Standalone (disambiguation)